Justice Olson or Olsen may refer to:

Conrad P. Olson, 48th associate justice of the Oregon Supreme Court
Ingerval M. Olsen, associate justice of the Minnesota Supreme Court
Julius J. Olson, associate justice of the Minnesota Supreme Court
Ralph O. Olson, associate justice of the Washington Supreme Court